Mahdalynivka is an urban-type settlement in Novomoskovsk Raion, Dnipropetrovsk Oblast in Ukraine. It hosts the administration of Mahdalynivka settlement hromada, one of the hromadas of Ukraine. Population:

Description
Mahdalynivka is located on the Chaplynka River, a left tributary of the Dnieper. Relief around the settlement is plain with unnoticed change in elevations since it is located in Dnieper Lowlands.

Mahdalynivka is first mentioned under its current name in 1783 in connection with delimitation of lands of the former Zaporizhian Sich (Zaporizhia Free Lands). According to "History of cities and villages of the Ukrainian SSR", the start of the settlement was given by 4 families who arrived from Poltava region (at that time Poltava Governorate). Mahdalynivka appeared on territory that during times of Zaporizhian Sich belonged to Provtocha Palanka, a territorial subdivision of Zaporizhian Sich. Researcher of regional studies L.M.Bezuhlyi in his book "Krai Mahdalynivskyi" (Land of Mahdalynivka) and authors of an essay "Mahdalynivshchyna" as the year of establishment of the village consider 1778. Such conclusion was made by them based on information that was provided by notable genealogist Vadym Modzalevskyi (a co-author of Armorial of Little Russia) and a data from "Mezhevaya kniga Azovskoi Gubernii" (Azov Governorate surveying book).

Until the raion was abolished on 18 July 2020, Mahdalynivka was the administrative center of Mahdalynivka Raion. After that date, it was transferred to Novomoskovsk Raion.

Economy

Transportation
Mahdalynivka is connected by roads with Dnipro and Petrykivka (with further access over the bridge to Kamianske). There are local roads as well.

Industry
 Mahdalynivka butter plant;
 Brick factory;
 Bakery plant;
 Municipal company;
 Private agricultural companies.

References

External links
 Kulakov, D.T., Kulykovskyi, B.H. Mahdalynivka, Mahdalynivka Raion, Dnipropetrovsk Oblast (Магдалинівка, Магдалинівський район, Дніпропетровська область). History of cities and villages of the Ukrainian SSR

Urban-type settlements in Novomoskovsk Raion